The Gotthard Base Tunnel (GBT; ,) is a railway tunnel through the Alps in Switzerland. It opened in June 2016 and full service began the following December. It lies at the heart of the Gotthard axis and constitutes the third tunnel connecting the cantons of Uri and Ticino, after the Gotthard Tunnel and the Gotthard Road Tunnel.

The GBT consists of a huge complex with, at its core, two single-track tunnels connecting Erstfeld (Uri) with Bodio (Ticino) and passing below Sedrun (Grisons). It is part of the New Railway Link through the Alps (NRLA) project, which also includes the Ceneri Base Tunnel further south (opened on 3 September 2020) and the Lötschberg Base Tunnel on the other main north–south axis. It is referred to as a "base tunnel" since it bypasses most of the existing Gotthard railway line, a winding mountain route opened in 1882 across the Saint-Gotthard Massif, which was operating at its capacity before the opening of the GBT. The Gotthard railway line has 36 tunnels totalling 31,216  metres. The new base tunnel establishes a direct route usable by high-speed rail and heavy freight trains.

The main purpose of the Gotthard Base Tunnel is to increase local transport capacity through the Alpine barrier, especially for freight on the Rotterdam–Basel–Genoa corridor, and more specifically to shift freight volumes from trucks to freight trains. This both significantly reduces the danger of fatal road crashes involving trucks, and reduces the environmental damage caused by heavy trucks. The tunnel provides a faster connection between the canton of Ticino and the rest of Switzerland, as well as between northern and southern Europe, cutting the Basel/Zürich–Lugano–Milan journey time for passenger trains by one hour (and from Lucerne to Bellinzona by 45 minutes).

After 64 percent of Swiss voters accepted the NRLA project in a 1992 referendum, the first preparatory and exploratory work began in 1996. Construction began in November 1999 at Amsteg. Drilling operations in the eastern tunnel were completed in October 2010 in a breakthrough ceremony broadcast live on Swiss TV, and in the western tunnel in March 2011. The final cost is projected as CHF 9.560 billion. Nine people died during construction.

Description
Without ventilation, the temperature inside the mountain reaches .

Like the two other tunnels passing below the Gotthard, the Gotthard Base Tunnel connects two Alpine valleys across the Saint-Gotthard Massif: the Urner Reusstal in the canton of Uri, in which flows the river Reuss, and the Valle Leventina, the largest valley in the canton of Ticino, in which the river Ticino flows. Unlike most other tunnels, the Gotthard Base Tunnel passes under several distinct mountain massifs, two of them being major subranges of the Alps, the Glarus Alps and the Saint-Gotthard Massif, with the valley of the Anterior Rhine, the Surselva in the canton of Graubünden, between them. While the cantons of Uri and Ticino are part of the German- and Italian-speaking areas of Switzerland respectively, the Surselva is mainly Romansh-speaking.

The Alps strongly influence the European climate – and that of Switzerland in particular – and there can be substantially different weather conditions at each end of the GBT, described by the Ticinese architect Mario Botta: "The light changes at the Gotthard: that of the Mediterranean Sea is not the same as that of the continent, that of the central lands, that of Europe far away from the sea."

There, the tunnel penetrates the western slopes of the Bälmeten and Chli Windgällen (although only marginally) before passing below the valley of the Chärstelenbach, a creek in the Maderanertal. From there, the tunnel runs parallel to the small valley of Etzli, below the Witenalpstock. From the crest and border, the tunnel runs parallel to the small valley of the river Strem (Val Strem) before passing below Sedrun and the Anterior Rhine. From the bottom of the valley, the tunnel proceeds towards the valley of the Rein da Nalps (Val Nalps) and passes east of Lai da Nalps, before crossing the Gannaretsch range below the western summit of Piz Vatgira. The tunnel then passes below the valley of the Rein da Medel (Val Medel) and west of Lai da Sontga Maria. After a few kilometres the tunnel crosses the watershed between the Anterior Rhine and the Ticino, just north of Pizzo dell'Uomo. This point corresponds to the main chain of the Alps, and is the main drainage divide between the Rhine and the Po. For a few kilometres, the tunnel passes below two western tributaries of the Brenno in the Valle Santa Maria before crossing the last range, west of the Passo Predèlp (about ) and east of Faido.

The closest railway stations to the portals are Altdorf and Biasca. The first regularly served railway stations on the base line (as of 2016/17) are those of Arth-Goldau (Schwyz), a railway node with links to Lucerne and Zürich, and Bellinzona (the "Gate of Ticino"), with links to Locarno, Luino and Lugano (via the Monte Ceneri Rail Tunnel). The journey from Arth-Goldau to Bellinzona takes not more than an hour. The station of Altdorf is planned to be served by 2021. There also have been talks of using that of Biasca. The travel between Altdorf and Biasca would last less than 25 minutes.

History

Background

Since the 13th century, the  Gotthard Pass has been an important trade route from northern to southern Europe. Control of its access routes led to the birth of the Swiss Confederacy. The Gotthard Pass is located halfway between Lake Lucerne and Lake Maggiore. It is the shortest link between the navigable Rhine and the Po. Before modern transport, the traverse of the pass took days, and snow makes it a challenge in winter.

Quite late, compared to other current top-importance routes through the Alps (e.g. Simplon, San Bernardino, Brenner, Mont Cenis), namely in 1830, the first Saint-Gotthard Pass road was established after centuries-long usage of a bridle path. From 1842 onwards, a daily course by the Gotthard Post, a stagecoach drawn by five horses with ten seats, still took about 23 hours from Como to Flüelen. It would last until 1921.

In 1882, with the inauguration of the Gotthard Railway Tunnel, the travel time between Altdorf and Biasca was reduced dramatically to only hours, though often accompanied with overnight stays in large Fin de siècle-hotels, for example in Biasca. In those days, it was still an adventure and it was only affordable to the rich. Electrification of the railway line in 1922 significantly reduced travel time even more. Refilling water boilers of steam locomotives was no longer necessary. There were also the technical advantages of electrical engines and future technical improvements.

From 1924, car transport on trains through the railway tunnel began. The road between Göschenen and Airolo through the summit of the pass, comporting notably the Schöllenen ravine and the Tremola, had countless hairpin turns and serpentine curves, dropping  in altitude. It posed a huge challenge for automobiles. From 1953 onwards, the pass road was sequentially improved and expanded at several sections along the Gotthard route, finally ending in 1977 with the opening of an expressway fully circumventing the Tremola. In winter, however, due to the snow, cars could only cross the Gotthard on the train.

Transit time was further dramatically reduced with the opening of the Gotthard Road Tunnel and the finalization of the northern part of A2 motorway through the Urner Reusstal (in close proximity to the railway), with many additional tunnels (then leading from Basel to the Gotthard Road Tunnel), in 1980. With the completion in 1986 of the A2 motorway in the Valle Leventina, the main valley leading from Airolo down to Bellinzona, and the surmounting of the Monte Ceneri between Bellinzona and Lugano in 1983, finally a continuous motorway was established from the northern border of Switzerland in Basel to the southern border in Chiasso, or the shortest motorway route from North-German Hamburg as far as South-Italian Sicily, bringing down the competitiveness of the railway line. Passenger speed was also increased on the railway line with the use of tilting trains, notably the ICN, although maximum speed remaining far lower than on a modern straight high-speed line. Both modern motorway and historic railway rely on heavy rockfall and avalanche protection equipments and are exposed to harsh weather condition in winter.

After the opening of the auto tunnel, in 1980, traffic increased more than tenfold. The existing tunnel was at its capacity by 2013. A second tunnel will be built next to the first, following a national referendum. Construction started in 2021 and is scheduled to finish in 2027

As early as 1947, engineer Eduard Gruner imagined a two-story base tunnel from Amsteg to Biasca, both rail and road, with a stop at Sedrun, to provide a faster and flatter passage through the Swiss Alps.

Because of ever-increasing international truck traffic, Swiss voters chose a shift in transportation policy in September 1992 by accepting the NRLA proposal. A second law, the Alpine Protection Act of February 1994, requires a shift of as much tonnage as possible from truck transport to train transport.

The goal of both the laws is to transport trucks, trailers and freight containers through Switzerland, from Basel to Chiasso, and beyond by rail to relieve the overused roads, and that of the Gotthard in particular, by using intermodal freight transport and rolling highways (where the entire truck is transported). The GBT substantially contributes to the requirements of both laws and enables a direct flat route from the ports of the North Sea (notably Rotterdam) to those of the Mediterranean Sea (notably Genoa), via the Rhine corridor.

At opening the GBT reduced travel times for trans-Alpine train journeys by about 40 minutes, and by one hour when the adjacent Zimmerberg and Ceneri Base Tunnels were completed. This is viewed as a revolution, especially in the isolated region of Ticino, which is separated from the rest of the country by the Alps and the Gotthard. The two stations of Bellinzona and Lugano (respectively named "Gate of Ticino" and "Terrace of Ticino") were entirely renovated for the opening of the GBT, among other improvements.

As of 2016, the Gotthard Base Tunnel is the longest railway tunnel in the world. It is the third Swiss tunnel to bear this title, after the Gotthard Tunnel (1882) and the Simplon Tunnel (1905). It is the third tunnel built under the Gotthard, after the Gotthard Tunnel and the Gotthard Road Tunnel.

Construction

AlpTransit Gotthard AG was responsible for construction. It is a wholly owned subsidiary of the Swiss Federal Railways (SBB CFF FFS).

To cut construction time in half, four access tunnels were built so that construction could start at four different sites simultaneously: Erstfeld, Amsteg, Sedrun, and Faido. A fifth at Bodio was added later. The two tunnels are joined approximately every  by connecting galleries. Trains can move between the tunnels in the two multifunction stations at Sedrun and Faido. These stations house ventilation equipment and technical infrastructure and serve as emergency stops and evacuation routes.

At the end of the access tunnel, two vertical shafts lead  down to the base tunnel level. A proposal to construct a functioning railway station, called Porta Alpina (from Romansh, "Alpine Gate"), at this site was evaluated, but the project was put on hold in 2007 and definitively cancelled by the federal authorities in 2012 as uneconomical.

The final breakthrough in the east tube occurred on 15 October 2010 at 14:17 +02:00. The final breakthrough in the west tube occurred on 23 March 2011 at 12:20.

On 30 August 2013, the tunnel was entirely traversed for the first time from Bodio to Erstfeld in six hours, by diesel train, buses and by foot.

On 16 December 2013, the operational test phase started on a  stretch in the southern section of the west tube between Faido and Bodio. Its purpose was to test the infrastructure and any ancillary systems.

On 31 October 2014, the railway track installation was completed. A gold sleeper on the very last part of the track was installed during the event to mark this milestone of progress.

On 1 October 2015, following permission by the Federal Office of Transport, the first tests on the entire length of the GBT were performed, with steadily increasing speed.

Allocation of work

The contracts were awarded in sections:
 Erstfeld (the  section from Erstfeld to Amsteg), with two tunnel boring machines (TBM) boring the two tubes. The break-through of the east tube between Erstfeld and Amsteg took place on 15 June 2009. The portal area was surface-mined.
 Amsteg (the  section from Amsteg to north of Sedrun), ARGE AGN (Strabag and Züblin Murer) received the contract for work in this sector. On 9 December 2009, the Amsteg section was officially delivered to the owner for fitting-out, with civil engineering, construction, concrete and lining work completed in early 2010.
 Sedrun (the  East tube and  West tube in the section immediately north and south of Sedrun), along with work performed by Transco (Bilfinger SE, Implenia, Frutiger and Impresa Pizzarotti). The final breakthrough in the west tube occurred in March 2011. The northbound tubes from Amsteg to the Sedrun multifunction station (north) were handed over to the railway systems contractor Transtec Gotthard on 15 September 2011, the date specified in the construction schedule.
 Faido ( East tube and  West tube in the section from south of Sedrun to Faido), with Consorzio TAT (Alpine Mayreder Bau, CSC Impresa costruzioni, Hochtief and Implenia and Impregilo).
 Bodio ( East tube and  West tube in the section from Faido to Bodio), with work performed by Consorzio TAT (Alpine Mayreder Bau, CSC Impresa costruzioni, Hochtief, Implenia and Impregilo). Civil engineering construction, concrete and lining works were completed in early 2010.

Deaths during construction
Nine workers died during construction; one in the Amsteg section, two in the Sedrun section, and three each in the southernmost Faido and Bodio sections.

Inauguration and commissioning

In 2016, several events, including festivities and special exhibitions, were held around the Gotthard, culminating in the inaugurations in early June, dubbed Gottardo 2016. Public institutions joined the celebrations: Swiss Post issued a special stamp commemorating the Gotthard Base Tunnel, and Swissmint issued gold and silver coins dedicated to the opening.

On 31 May 2016, a day before the inauguration, the nine people who died during construction were commemorated in a ceremony at the north portal in Erstfeld that was led by a Catholic vicar general, a vicar of the Evangelical-Reformed Church of Uri, a Jewish rabbi, and a Muslim imam. A bronze memorial plaque with their names — four coming from Germany, three from Italy, and one from each of South Africa and Austria – was unveiled by AlpTransit Gotthard AG CEO Renzo Simoni. A Catholic shrine to Saint Barbara, the patron of miners, stands inside the tunnel as a memorial.

The tunnel was officially inaugurated on 1 June 2016. At the northern entrance in Erstfeld, President of the Confederation Johann Schneider-Ammann spoke of a "giant step for Switzerland but equally for our neighbours and the rest of the continent", while a live relay carried a speech given by Transport Minister Doris Leuthard at the southern entrance in Bodio. The first journey carried hundreds of Swiss citizens who had won tickets in a draw, while the assembled guests in Erstfeld, including the Federal Council in corpore, heads of state and government from neighbouring countries and transport ministers from European countries, attended the opening show Sacre del Gottardo by Volker Hesse featuring 600 dancers, acrobats, singers and musicians celebrating Alpine culture and myths around the Gotthard. On the following weekend, popular festivities and special exhibitions, attended by more than 100,000 visitors, were held.

From 2 August to 27 November 2016, the Swiss Federal Railways ran a special train service through the tunnel called "Gottardino" which was open to the public. It was a once-daily service from Flüelen railway station to Biasca railway station and in reverse. The trains made a stop inside the tunnel, to allow passengers to visit an exhibition inside the underground multifunction station in Sedrun which would normally be used in emergency only.

Regular services

During 2016, the GBT was tested extensively before its integration into the regular schedule on 11 December. On 5 December, the Swiss Federal Railways were granted permission from the Federal Transport Office to use the new base line. While the base tunnel is used for InterCity trains (ICN) and EuroCity trains (EC), the summit line remains in use for regional trains. From 2019 onwards, the Gotthard axis will be served by the Stadler EC250 (Giruno), high-speed train and future flagship of the SBB fleet.

From the Amsteg portal, guided tours are organised inside the Gotthard Base Tunnel complex. A window allows visitors to watch the trains running in the tunnel.

Politics

The realization of the GBT, as the centrepiece of the NRLA, is also a prototypical example of direct democracy in Switzerland. In order to accomplish this mega-project the political institutions also had to overcome many parliamentary sessions and several major popular votes, including the following:

27 September 1992, NRLA proposal (mandatory referendum): The final proposal by the Federal Council was accepted by 63.6% yes votes (declined by 1+2/2 cantons, turnout 45.9%)
20 February 1994, Alps Initiative (federal popular initiative): Initiated by a few private people with the goal to protect the Alpine environment from the negative impact of traffic was accepted by 51.9% yes votes (declined by 7 cantons, turnout 41%). The initiative was accepted despite the recommendation by the Federal Council from 12 February 1992 to decline the initiative without any counterproposal, and despite the parliamentary  recommendation (both chambers) from 18 June 1993 to decline the initiative.
29 November 1998, Public Transport Funding (mandatory referendum): A total budget of CHF 30 billion for several public transport projects was accepted by 63.5% yes votes (declined by 1+3/2 cantons, turnout 38.3%); "the NRLA is to receive CHF 13.6 billion"
17 December 2003, Ceneri Base Tunnel (parliamentary session): The controversial funding of the Ceneri Base Tunnel was finally passed by parliamentary approval only; the possibility for an optional referendum was not raised by any political groups, nor by the public. The then-in-charge transport minister, Federal Councilor Moritz Leuenberger, was quoted as saying "This is the only way to make the railway [the Gotthard axis] a flat line between Basel and Chiasso."

Figures

Diameter of each of the single-track tubes: 
Distance between cross passage tube: ca. 
Numbers of cross passage tubes: 178
Maximum rock overlay:  (at Piz Vatgira)
Start of construction: 1993 (sounding drills), 1996 (preparations), 4 November 1999 (official start, first blasting), 2003 (mechanical excavation)
Breakthrough: 15 October 2010 (Eastern tube), 23 March 2011 (Western tube)
Commissioning: May 2016
Inauguration/opening: 1 June 2016
Start of daily passenger service: 11 December 2016 (see public transport timetable#Switzerland)
Total cost: CHF 9.560 billion
Travel time: Passenger trains – 20 minutes
Number of tunnel boring machines (TBM): Four Herrenknecht Gripper TBMs. Machine numbers S-210 and S-211 operated northbound from Bodio to Faido and Sedrun and were nicknamed Sissi and Heidi respectively; Machines S-229 and S-230 operated southbound from Erstfeld to Sedrun and were known as Gabi I and Gabi II.
Total length:  (including back-up equipment)
Total weight: 
Power: 5 MW
Max. excavation daily:  (in excellent rock conditions)
Manufacturer: Herrenknecht, Schwanau, Germany

Operation

Reduced travel times

Safety

The safety requirements on the rolling stock will be similar to those of other long Swiss tunnels, including the ability for the emergency brake to be overridden.

Traffic

Since the opening date on 1 June 2016, between 130 and 160 trains on an average working day operated through the Gotthard Base Tunnel, which in March 2019 marked the 100,000th transit. Around two-thirds of the passages were freight trains and the remaining quota were passenger trains, both national and international.

Projections

The number of projected trains per day was 180–260 freight trains and 50 (65 from 2020) passenger trains.

Passengers
After the opening of the tunnel there was an increase in passengers crossing the trans-alpine line, with 2.3 million passengers in the first 8 months, an increase of 30% over the previous year.

In August 2017, an average of 10,400 people crossed the tunnel daily. Train services from Italy to Switzerland through the line are expected to become faster from 2020, with the opening of the Ceneri Base Tunnel, with an expected further increase in passenger numbers.
There are plans for a train service between Zürich and Milan with a journey time of 2:45 hours, down from 3:50 hours.

Freight
 on 120 trains passed through the tunnel each day during the first half year of operation.

See also
Mont d'Ambin Base Tunnel, a planned base tunnel that will be slightly longer than the GBT.
Rail transport in Switzerland
High-speed rail in Switzerland
List of tunnels in Switzerland
List of tunnels in the Alps
List of tunnels by location
List of transport megaprojects

Notes

References

External links

Gotthard Tunnel Experience, Uri Tourism
Gottardo 2016, official inauguration website
SRF Gotthard – Die Eröffnung, official coverage and background information by SRF Swiss Radio and Television 
RTS Gothard – L'inauguration du tunnel, official coverage and background information by RTS Radio Télévision Suisse 
Alptransit Gotthard AG official website

AGN Erstfeld Amsteg Constructors Web Site (many photos and designs)
Faido Bodio Constructors Web Site (many photos and designs)

Videos
Aerial views of the works (by AlpTransit AG): 2012, 2013, 2014, 2015
Journey through the GBT (SRF DOK)
Flight over the GBT (SRF DOK)
17 years of construction (NRLA)
Corporate videos: AlpTransit Gotthard AG (main contractor), Herrenknecht (TBM), ABB (ventilation), Thales (railway signalling), Transtec Gotthard (railway technology)
Routes
 Gotthard-Basistunnel (6283450)

Railway tunnels in Switzerland
Dual-tube railway tunnels
High-speed railway lines in Switzerland
Tunnels in the Alps
Base tunnels
Tunnels in the canton of Uri
Graubünden–Uri border
Tunnels in Graubünden
Graubünden–Ticino border
Tunnels in Ticino
Ticino–Uri border
Tunnels completed in 2016
Gotthard railway
2016 establishments in Switzerland